Sir Albion Rajkumar Banerjee (10 October 1871 – 25 February 1950) was an Indian civil servant and administrator who served as the Diwan of Cochin from 1907 to 1914, 21st Diwan of Mysore from 1922 to 1926, and as Prime Minister of Kashmir from 1927 to 1929.

Early life and education

Albion Rajkumar Banerjee was born in a Bengali Brahmo family in Bristol on 10 October 1871 to Sasipada Banerji, His father was a noted social reformer and labour activist from Baranagar near Calcutta, and Rajkumari Banerji. He studied at the General Assembly's Institution and graduated from the University of Calcutta. Subsequently he earned his master's degree at the Balliol College, Oxford.

He married Nalini Gupta, daughter of Sir Krishna Govinda Gupta, the 7th Indian to join the ICS, who, towards the end of his distinguished career in the civil service, went to the Secretary of State's Council in London.

Career

Magistrate
He cleared the Imperial Civil Service examinations in 1894 and was appointed Assistant Collector and Magistrate in the Madras Presidency.

Premierships

Kingdom of Cochin 
Banerjee was appointed Diwan of Cochin in May 1907 and served till 1914. He introduced The Cochin State Manual.

Kingdom of Mysore 
Banerjee became a minister (councillor as they were known) in Diwan Sir M. Visvesvaraya's cabinet in 1914. After the resignation of Visvesvaraya as Diwan, Banerjee became the First Councillor in Diwan Sir M. Kantaraj Urs's cabinet. Banerjee would have left Mysore service much earlier but ended up as the Diwan of Mysore since Urs resigned owing to ill health. He served as Diwan from 1922 to 1926. He signed the 1924 Cauvery accord with Madras Presidency.

Kingdom of Kashmir 
Banerjee was appointed the first and only prime minister of Kashmir in 1927 to Maharaja Hari Singh. He resigned in 1929 over differences with maharaja on the grounds of his lavish lifestyle sustained by a poor population. His wrote:

Publications
Indian Affairs (a quarterly journal published from London). 
Indian Tangle (Hutchmson—London)
Indian Path-Finder (Kemp Hall Press—Oxford)
Rhythm Of Living (Ryder & Co -London)
Looking Ahead in Wartime (Harmony Press-London) 
What is Wrong with India (Kitabistan—Allahabad)
Through an Indian Camera (Bangalore Press)

Honours 
Companion of the Order of the Indian Empire (1912)
Companion of the Order of the Star of India (1921)
Knighthood (1925)

Notes

References 

 

1871 births
1950 deaths
Indian Civil Service (British India) officers
19th-century Bengalis
20th-century Bengalis
Brahmos
Politicians from Kolkata
Chief Ministers of Jammu and Kashmir (princely state)
Companions of the Order of the Indian Empire
Companions of the Order of the Star of India
Diwans of Cochin
Diwans of Mysore
Indian Knights Bachelor
Knights Bachelor
Civil servants from Bristol
Scottish Church College alumni
University of Calcutta alumni
Indian civil servants